Khosrowabad Rural District is a rural district (dehestan) in Chang Almas District, Bijar County, Kurdistan Province, Iran. At the 2006 census, its population was 4,319, in 985 families. The rural district has 20 villages.

References 

Rural Districts of Kurdistan Province
Bijar County